The 2019–20 Chinese Women's Volleyball Super League was the 24th season of the Chinese Women's Volleyball Super League, the highest professional volleyball league in China. The season began on 2 November 2019 and ended with the Finals on 21 January 2020. Beijing Baic Motor were the defending champions.

Clubs

Clubs and locations

Regular season

First stage

Group A

|}
Source: Ranking Table Group A

|}

Group B

|}
Source: Ranking Table Group B

|}

Group C

|}
Source: Ranking Table Group C

|}

Group D

|}
Source: Ranking Table Group D

|}

Second stage

Group E

|}
Source: Ranking Table Group E

|}

Group F

|}
Source: Ranking Table Group F

|}

Group G

|}
Source: Ranking Table Group G

|}

Group H

|}
Source: Ranking Table Group H

|}

Final stage

Bracket

Third stage

Thirteenth place match

|}

Eleventh place match

|}

Ninth place match

|}

Fifth place play-offs
 (E3) Shandong Sports Lottery vs (F4) Liaoning Huajun

|}

 (F3) Jiangsu Zhongtian Steel vs (E4) Bayi Nanchang

|}

Final four
 (E1) Shanghai Bright Ubest vs (F2) Guangdong Evergrande

|}

 (F1) Tianjin Bohai Bank vs (E2) Beijing Baic Motor

|}

Fourth stage

Seventh place match

|}

Fifth place match

|}

Third place match

|}

Final

|}

Final standing

References

External links 
 Official website of the Chinese Volleyball Association

League 2019-20
Chinese Volleyball Super League, 2019-20
Chinese Volleyball Super League, 2019-20
Volleyball League, 2019-20
Volleyball League, 2019-20